Banzai is a 1997 Italian comedy film directed by Carlo Vanzina. It is a sequel to 1995 film I Don't Speak English.

Cast
Paolo Villaggio as Sergio Colombo
Antonio Ballerio as Sergio's principal
Francesca Romana Coluzzi as Ilaria
Francesco De Rosa as Pasquale Cuccurullo
Roberto Della Casa as Sergio's colleague
Laura Migliacci as Betta Colombo
John Armstead as mister Parker
Francesca Ventura as Paola
Haruhiko Yamanouchi as Japanese officer
Taiyo Yamanouchi as Japanese officer

References

External links

1997 films
Films directed by Carlo Vanzina
1990s Italian-language films
1997 comedy films
Italian comedy films
1990s Italian films